Ibn Hisham Al-Ansari (708 AH – 761 AH) (1309 CE – 1360 CE) was an Egyptian scholar of Arabic grammar.

Biography
Ibn Hisham Al-Ansari was born in Cairo in Dhu al-Qadah, in the year of 708 AH, corresponding to the year 1309 CE.

He grew up loving science and scholars, taking many of them away as he needed some of the literati and the virtuous.

Books
This linguist has written several books, including:
Qatr al-Nada
Expressing the Arabic grammar rules

Death
Ibn Hisham died on a Friday night on the fifth of Dhu al-Qadah in the year 761 AH, corresponding to the year 1360 CE.

References

14th-century Egyptian people
Arab grammarians
Writers from Cairo
Grammarians of Arabic
Medieval grammarians of Arabic
Linguists from Egypt
1309 births
1360 deaths